BA20 may refer to:

 Brodmann area 20, a part of the temporal cortex in the human brain
 BA-20, an armored car developed in the Soviet Union in 1936 
 A postcode district in the BA postcode area
 A type of bayonet mount fastening mechanism
 Band Aid 20